Cervecería de Baja California (founded in 2002), is a Mexican brewery, located in the city of Mexicali, and is one of a handful of Mexican microbrews. The product they brew is Cucapá Beer. This name comes from one of the five Indian tribes that live in the Mexicali Valley. The Cucapá tribe was the first settlers of the region and their love for water and nature took them to live in the Colorado River delta.

Stealing the tradition of nature, the water of the river, the geographical location and the initiative of being the first people to explore the region is what makes Cerveza Cucapá as unique as the Cucapá tribe's ancestors.

Cucapá Beer is elaborated to be sold in a few stores of Mexicali, in some restaurants in Baja California and in the northwestern region of Mexico and southwestern region of the United States.

Their products include Cucapá Clásica (Classic, Blonde Ale style), Cucapá Light (Low Calories Ale style), Cucapá Honey (Amber Ale style), Cucapá Trigueña (Goldie/Brunette, Wheat Ale style), Cucapá Obscura (Dark, American Brown Ale style), Cucapá Chupacabras (By the Chupacabra, the goat sucker, a famous cryptid being that appeared in Latin America in the early 1990s, Pale Ale style) and Cucapá Barleywine.

See also
Cucapá Beer
Mexican beer

External links
Cucapá - Official website.
Wine Warehouse - California Distributor
Little Guy Distributing - Arizona Distributor
Union Tribune - "Mexican Beer Gets Serious" (November 30, 2005)

Mexicali
Economy of Baja California
Beer in Mexico
Mexican brands